MagSafe is a proprietary, magnetically attached wireless power transfer and accessory-attachment standard developed by Apple Inc. for its iPhone and AirPods product lines. It was announced on 13 October 2020, in conjunction with the iPhone 12 and 12 Pro series. It provides up to 15 W of power and is compatible with the open Qi standard for up to 7.5 W of power. The connector also enables connecting non-charger accessories such as card holders and cases with communication through an integrated NFC loop.

Apple released two chargers using the MagSafe standard in 2020: the MagSafe Charger, a single charging pad for iPhone, and the MagSafe Duo Charger, a charging mat with MagSafe and an Apple Watch charger. Apple has also licensed the MagSafe standard to third parties to develop chargers and cases. In 2021, Apple released the MagSafe Battery Pack and added MagSafe charging to AirPods and AirPods Pro.

History 

The MagSafe name was first used by Apple for its MacBook lineup, beginning with the 2006 MacBook Pro. It began to be phased out upon the release of the fourth-generation MacBook Pro in 2016, which used USB-C for charging. MagSafe was discontinued across MacBooks in 2019, but reintroduced with 14-inch and 16-inch MacBook Pro models released in October 2021.

In 2017, Apple announced AirPower, a wireless charging mat capable of charging an iPhone, AirPods and Apple Watch (which uses a proprietary wireless charging system) simultaneously and the devices could be placed anywhere on the mat. However, it was canceled in early 2019 due to overheating issues due to the many overlapping coils.

Apple announced MagSafe along with the iPhone 12 series on 13 October 2020 during the “Hi, Speed” Apple Special Event as a universal ecosystem of wireless charging and accessories. Apple's chargers based on MagSafe are their first to use the Qi standard, following the development of AirPower. The MagSafe receptacle on iPhones, internally called MagSafe Attach, uses magnets to align automatically and attach to a Qi charger, ensuring reliable charging.

On 18 October 2021, Apple released the 3rd generation AirPods and an updated SKU of AirPods Pro with a bundled MagSafe charging case.

In 2023, the Wireless Power Consortium announced the Qi2 standard that is based on MagSafe.

Chargers and accessories

MagSafe Charger 
The MagSafe Charger is a single charging pad that contains recyclable rare-earth magnets surrounding a Qi wireless charging coil attached to a 1m USB-C cable. The MagSafe Charger delivers up to 15 W of power on the iPhone 12 and 13 series, with the exception of the iPhone 12 Mini and 13 Mini, which support 12 W. The Wall Street Journal found MagSafe charged at half the speed of a 20W wired charger. MagSafe can also charge other Qi-certified devices, including older iPhone models and AirPods, though testing has found that MagSafe charges significantly slower than 7.5 W Qi chargers on iPhones older than the iPhone 12 series. Devices without MagSafe need to be manually aligned as they do not have the built-in array of magnets that interlock with MagSafe. Apple recommends a 20 W power adapter. Users have reported MagSafe Chargers leaving circular imprints on leather cases.

MagSafe Duo Charger 
The MagSafe Duo Charger is a foldable charging mat with a MagSafe charger on one side and an Apple Watch charger on the other. The Apple Watch charger disc can be raised to a 90 degree angle to charge a watch with a closed wristband. The MagSafe Duo charger can be folded when not in use. The charger comes with a Lightning to USB-C cable, and Apple recommends their newer 30 W USB-C power adapter (released in 2018), and notes their older 29 W adapter is incompatible and can only charge one device at a time.

Durability testing performed by Apple Insider found that the hinge could fail with frequent folding, noting it "started to break down at 180 folds and ultimately failed at 212." The larger camera array on the iPhone 13 Pro elevates the top end from the charger with a case, though charging is unaffected. The MagSafe Duo does not support fast charging on the Apple Watch Series 7, Series 8 and Ultra.

MagSafe Battery Pack 
In July 2021, Apple released the MagSafe Battery Pack. It contains a 11.13Wh, 1,460mAh battery that can charge an iPhone at 5W. It charges either via Lightning, which can also charge a connected iPhone at 15 W, or by reverse charging when connected to a compatible iPhone charging via Lightning. A firmware update in April 2022 increased the charging speed to 7.5W.

Cases, wallets and sleeves 

Apple released a line of MagSafe cases and other accessories, such as leather sleeves and wallets that can attach magnetically to iPhones and cases with MagSafe. Apple states MagSafe charging works through their cases. Apple states that their leather wallets are shielded to protect credit cards from the rare-earth magnets used in these accessories, although warns that credit cards should not be placed between an iPhone and a MagSafe charger. In 2021, Apple released an updated MagSafe wallet with an NFC chip that supports Find My location tracking when the wallet is disconnected from an iPhone, but is not supported by Apple's clear cases for iPhone 12 models.

Third party chargers and accessories 

Apple refers to officially licensed third party MagSafe products as "Made for MagSafe". Apple worked with Belkin to design chargers using MagSafe, including a 2-in-1 charger, 3-in-1 charger and a car mount. At launch, Belkin was the only accessory maker Apple had licensed the MagSafe charging standard to; while other third-party accessory makers advertise magnetic charging products as "MagSafe compatible," they use older Qi standards that deliver a maximum charging speed of 7.5 W, compared to MagSafe's 15 W, and lack integrated NFC. In 2022, accessory maker Mophie worked with Apple to release a 3-in-1 Made for MagSafe travel charger; Nomad also released a charging base. OtterBox manufactures officially licensed cases and a 2-in-1 charger.

Devices supporting MagSafe 
The following devices support MagSafe:
iPhones released in October 2020 and later (iPhone 12/12 Pro and newer) except the iPhone SE (3rd generation)
MagSafe Charging Case for AirPods (3rd generation)
MagSafe Charging Case for AirPods Pro (first generation SKUs after October 2021 and second generation)

References

External links 

 MagSafe charger
 MagSafe Duo Charger

Wireless energy transfer
Computer-related introductions in 2020
Apple Inc. hardware